WFT may refer to:
 West Fraser Timber TSX code, a Canadian forestry company
 Weatherford International NYSE code
 Weighted Fourier Transform, a command in the vnmr NMR software
 Washington Football Team, former temporary name of the NFL team now known as the Washington Commanders